is a Japanese painter.

Biography
 Born in Miyama (present day Kihoku), Kitamura, Mie, Japan in 1940, his father was a cleric.
 He graduated from Asahigaoka High School (旭丘高校) in Aichi.
 In 1959, he enrolled on the oil painting course at the Tokyo National University of Fine Arts and Music.
 In 1964 he held his first solo exhibition.
 In 1965 he worked as a part-time lecturer at Musashino Art University (武蔵野美術大学)
 In 1971 he won a scholarship from the Italian government and stayed in Rome for six years, also travelled in Spain while studying Western art.
 Returned to Japan in 1977
 In 1980 he was an assistant professor of the Japanese painting course at Nagoya University of Arts (名古屋芸術大学)
In 1986 he was professor at Nagoya University of Arts.
 On March 15, 2006, he was awarded the Education, Science and Technology Minister's Art Encouragement Prize (芸術選奨文部科学大臣賞).
 On June 5, 2006, the Education, Science and Technology Minister's Art Encouragement Prize (芸術選奨文部科学大臣賞) was stripped from Wada because of plagiarism.

Allegations of plagiarism
After receiving the education minister's prize in March , allegations of plagiarism surfaced after an anonymous tip-off was received by the Japan Artists Association and Agency for Cultural Affairs in April putting into question the authenticity of some of Wada's paintings. An investigation revealed that several of Wada's works had striking similarities to those of Alberto Sughi. According to Wada, he has been familiar with Sughi since his study in Italy in the 1970s. He denies plagiarism stating that he had worked with Sughi and was inspired by their collaboration. Also his exhibited works were an homage to Sughi. However, Sughi says he had no idea Wada was a painter and had thought he was just an admirer of his artwork. He was contacted by the Japanese embassy in Italy in early May and was shocked to learn of Wada's paintings. A review panel including three of the seven judges that awarded Wada the prize concluded that there was insufficient evidence to suggest Wada did not plagiarise Sughi's works. As a result, the Agency for Cultural Affairs decided on June 5 to strip Wada of the prize making it the first time in the prize's history that an artist was stripped of the award.

See also
 Alberto Sughi

External links
 Alberto Sughi's website
 Photos of Yoshihiko Wada from Morimura Seiichi Photo gallery
 Comparison of one Wada painting and Sughi painting

1940 births
Living people
Artists from Mie Prefecture
Japanese painters
Tokyo University of the Arts alumni